Kelley Peak is a peak,  high, forming the south end of the Liberty Hills in the Heritage Range, Antarctica. It was named by the Advisory Committee on Antarctic Names for air crewman Charles C. Kelley of the United States Navy who perished in the crash of the LC-47 aircraft on the Ross Ice Shelf on February 2, 1966.

See also
 Mountains in Antarctica

References

Mountains of Ellsworth Land